Virgin Snow (첫눈 - Cheotnun, 初雪の恋 ヴァージン・スノー - Hatsuyuki no koi) is a 2007 South Korean film directed by Han Sang-hye and starring Korean actor, Lee Joon-gi and Japanese actress, Aoi Miyazaki.

Plot
Min, a young Korean boy, moves to Japan with his father, who is a potter. One day at a local shrine, Min meets Nanae, a beautiful local girl and aspiring painter. He falls in love at first sight. She is a student at his new school, and their friendship develops despite their cultural and language differences. However, Min's grandmother suddenly falls ill, and Min returns to Korea without having a chance to explain to Nanae. While he is gone, Nanae is forced to move away to protect her and her sister from their mother's violent boyfriend. Before Min and Nanae separate, Nanae gives Min an amulet pouch with a letter inside. She tells him to open it later, and so he doesn't open it before he goes to see his grandmother. Min's grandmother notices it in his pocket and assumes that it is a present for her from Japan; not wanting to disappoint his grandmother, Min gives away the amulet pouch. When Min's grandmother eventually recovers, he returns to Japan only to find that Nanae is gone.

Two years later a friend of Min finds Nanae drawing in a park. Nanae explains the reason she disappeared, and learns that Min returned to Korea because he felt there was no reason to stay.  A few months later Nanae and Min stumble upon each other at an art show in Korea. However, Min is still bruised from being left without news and reacts harshly at the reunion.

Later Min's grandmother discovers the letter inside the amulet pouch and gives it to him. The letter says that Nanae wants to be with Min forever but cannot because she has to go, but asks him to meet her at the first snow on Deoksugung street in Seoul. Min travels to Kyoto and finds diary entries from Nanae, saying that she has been waiting for him in vain there for several years. He leaves back to Seoul, but when at the airport in Seoul notices snowflakes starting to fall. He rushes to Deoksugung, and on a tree finds a paper note hoping that he will return (he tied the paper note there after he met with Nanae in Seoul). He turns to find Nanae and they tearfully reunite.

Cast
Lee Joon-gi as Kim-min
Aoi Miyazaki as Sasaki Nanae
Kimiko Yo
Otoha
Ayaka Morita
Shun Shioya
Miyu Yagyu
Lee-hwan as Kim Da-hyeon

References

Bibliography
 Hatsuyuki No Koi Official Site 
 
 
 

2007 films
2000s Korean-language films
South Korean drama films
Japanese drama films
Television shows written by Kazuhiko Ban
2000s Japanese films
2000s South Korean films